Women & Songs is a series of annual Canadian compilation album releases that only contain tracks by female artists. The first album, simply titled Women & Songs, was released December 9, 1997 and the series has since been both a major seller and a chart-topper in the Canadian music scene.

List of Women & Songs albums

Regular series
 Women & Songs
 Women & Songs 2
 Women & Songs 3
 Women & Songs 4
 Women & Songs 5
 Women & Songs 6
 Women & Songs 7
 Women & Songs 8
 Women & Songs 9
 Women & Songs 10
 Women & Songs 11
 Women & Songs 12

Special releases
 Women & Songs: Beginnings
 Women & Songs: Beginnings Volume 2
 Women & Songs: 60s Girl Groups
 Women & Songs: The 80s
 Women & Songs Christmas

Compilation album series